The NAIA Women's Cross Country Championship is the annual cross country meet to determine the national champions of NAIA women's cross country running in the United States and Canada. It has been held annually since 1980 (two years before the NCAA began to sponsor women's sports). 

A team and individual championship are contested each year.

The most successful program are Simon Fraser, who have won 10 national titles.

The current champions are Taylor, who won their first title in 2022.

Results

Champions

Team titles, by school

See also
NAIA Men's Cross Country Championship
NCAA Women's Cross Country Championships (Division I, Division II, Division III)
NCAA Men's Cross Country Championships (Division I, Division II, Division III)

References

External links
NAIA Web site

College cross country in the United States
Cross country running competitions
Cross country
Women's sports in the United States